This is a list of governors of the Austrian state of Tyrol:

See also
Tyrol

Tyrol
Tyrol
Governors